Michael Kaiser is the president of the John F. Kennedy Center for the Performing Arts.

Michael Kaiser is also the name of:

Mike Kaiser (born 1963), Australian politician
 Michael M. Kaiser Associates